Al-Annazah  is a Syrian village located in Tartus District, Tartus.  According to the Syria Central Bureau of Statistics (CBS), Al-Annazah had a population of 1,944 in the 2004 census.

References 

Populated places in Tartus District